The IPW:UK World Championship was a professional wrestling world championship created and promoted by the English professional wrestling promotion, International Pro Wrestling: United Kingdom.

The championship was originally established on July 16, 2005 as the IPW:UK Championship and Aviv Maayan was the inaugural champion.  Maayan defeated Martin Stone and Steve Douglas in a three-way match to become the inaugural champion.

The championship was originally established on 16 July 2005 as the IPW:UK Championship and Aviv Maayan was the inaugural champion.  Maayan defeated Martin Stone and Steve Douglas in a three-way match to become the inaugural champion.

On 13 September 2009; reigning All-England Championship Leroy Kincaide defeated reigning IPW:UK Champion Alex Shane unifying both championships. The title was renamed the IPW:UK British Championship. 

In August 2012; then IPW:UK booker Andy Quildan left the company thus Revolution Pro Wrestling (RPW or RevPro) was founded. Quidlan recognised a number of titles and champions he had been working with in IPW:UK, including the British Heavyweight Championship, thus creating RPW British Heavyweight Championship.  Shortly after, the IPW:UK British Heavyweight Championship became the IPW:UK World Championship. Sha Samuels continued to be recognized as IPW:UK World Champion and RevPro continued to recognize him as their British Heavyweight Champions.

On 24 September 2017, all IPW:UK Championships were vacated and retired.

Title history

Names

Reigns

Combined reigns

See also
IPW:UK Tag Team Championship
IPW:UK Women's Championship

References

External links
IPW:UK World Championship

International Pro Wrestling: United Kingdom championships
National professional wrestling championships
Heavyweight wrestling championships
World professional wrestling championships
Professional wrestling in the United Kingdom